Ağaməmmədli or Agamamedli or Agmamedly may refer to:
Ağaməmmədli, Imishli, Azerbaijan
Agamamedli, Saatly, Azerbaijan
Ağaməmmədli, Tovuz, Azerbaijan